The Light Commando Battalions (LCB) are commando units of the Pakistan Army, tasked with special operations and counter-terrorism. Each battalion is affiliated with but not part of an Army infantry regiment.

The LCB (Punjab) took part in defending military bases, which were attacked by militants on 15th August 2014. On 15 April 2015, the LCB (Punjab) held an open day for select members of the public to let them see the work of the unit, as part of a public awareness campaign. A company from Light Commando Battalion (Punjab) was allocated to the security measures for the 2021 tour by the New Zealand cricket team before it was cancelled.

In June 2017, 2 LCB (Baloch) participated in a raid, with other units, on a suspected militant base in Mastung, Balochistan. 

The LCB (Azad Kashmir) participated in the Pakistan Day parade in Islamabad on 23 March 2022.

List
 2 Light Commando Battalion (Baloch)
 4 Light Commando Battalion (Azad Kashmir)
 5 Light Commando Battalion (Sindh)
 9 Light Commando Battalion (FF)
 6 Light Commando Battalion (NLI)

See also
List of commando units
List of military special forces units

References

Military special forces of Pakistan